China Everbright International Limited is a Hong Kong incorporated company that specialized in environmental resource management in mainland China.

On the mainland it has offices in Beijing, Jinan, Nanjing, and Shenzhen.

History
China Everbright Holdings, a Chinese state-owned enterprise based in Hong Kong, takeover a listed company in Hong Kong in 1993 (incorporated in 1961) and injected part of the group's business into the listed company.

In 2012, vice-chairman Li Xueming resigned, following rumour on his true name and identity as the elder brother of arrested government officials Bo Xilai.

In 2017, Everbright Greentech was split from the company.

References

External links
 

Companies listed on the Hong Kong Stock Exchange
Government-owned companies of China
Waste management companies of China
Service companies of Hong Kong
China Everbright Group
1993 establishments in Hong Kong
Waste companies established in 1993
Chinese companies established in 1993